Barnett Kenna (1827 – May 28, 1890) was a Union Navy sailor in the American Civil War and a recipient of the U.S. military's highest decoration, the Medal of Honor, for his actions at the Battle of Mobile Bay.

Kenna was born in 1827 in Canterbury, England. At the Battle of Mobile Bay on August 5, 1864, he "fought his gun with skill and courage" despite heavy fire. For this action, he was awarded the Medal of Honor four months later, on December 31, 1864. He was discharged in January 1866. 

Kenna's official Medal of Honor citation reads:
On board the U.S.S. Brooklyn during action against rebel forts and gunboats and with the ram Tennessee, in Mobile Bay, 5 August 1864. Despite severe damage to his ship and the loss of several men on board as enemy fire raked her decks from stem to stern Kenna fought his gun with skill and courage throughout the furious action which resulted in the surrender of the rebel ram Tennessee and in the damaging and destruction of batteries at Fort Morgan.

Kenna died on May 28, 1890, at age 62 or 63 and was buried at Cherry Hill Cemetery in Gloucester, Massachusetts.

References

External links 
 

1827 births
1890 deaths
People from Canterbury
British emigrants to the United States
People of Massachusetts in the American Civil War
Union Navy sailors
United States Navy Medal of Honor recipients
American people of Scottish descent
English-born Medal of Honor recipients
People from Gloucester, Massachusetts
American Civil War recipients of the Medal of Honor